Parapercis maritzi is a fish species in the sandperch family, Pinguipedidae. It is found in South African part of the Indian Ocean. 
This species can reach a length of  TL.

Etymology
The fish is named in honor of Willie Maritz, the Curator of the East London Aquarium in South Africa.

References

Pinguipedidae
Taxa named by Michael Eric Anderson
Fish described in 1992